El Castillo Hotel is a building with medieval-style architecture that was built in 1870 and is located in Valle Hermoso (Córdoba), Argentina.
Throughout its life under the management of different owners, it has been, in chronological order, a family mansion, a time period hotel, a union summer camp, and a five-star hotel.

El Castillo Hotel is a member of Historic Hotels Worldwide.

History 

The castle was built as the primary farmhouse of the "Las Playas" estancia around 1870, in the town of Valle Hermoso, Córdoba Provincia de Córdoba, Argentine Republic.
At the beginnings of the 20th century, the farmhouse was expanded, while conserving its medieval Florentine style, and turned into the luxurious "Hotel Monte Olivo", beautified with floors of granite and parquet, cedar and cinchona cabinetry, Provence furniture, porcelain and silver tableware, bronze bathroom fittings, and wrought iron light fixtures. 
In the 1930s, the castle passed to the hands of the Italian immigrant Don José Ferrarini
, who, a few years later, closed its doors and the building was kept unused for more than thirty years.

From 1970 to 2000, the property was used as a summer camp for the metal workers union ("Unión Obrera Metalúrgica"), and was allotted to student and senior tourism operators. The last years of this phase, EL CASTILLO remained impossible to use due to the deterioration suffered by neglect, lack of maintenance and repeated looting. In 2002, the castle regained its historical value thanks to a four-year restoration, carried out entirely by local workers and craftsmen led by an Argentine family. Since 2006, under the name of “El Castillo Hotel  Fábrega Organizational Center” it operates as a hotel specialized in family tourism, corporate events and training programs.

Architecture 
El Castillo has 7000 square metres and four hectares of grounds. In the different modules, the building combines materials such as stone, brick, fine plaster, solid wood, and wrought iron. The windows and doors are straight lines, but are marked with stone arches. The upper finishing has a jagged shape with battlements, and in every angle there are watchtowers. The roofs have flat terraces and inclined surfaces with Spanish tiles. It has 45 rooms of up to 90 square metres.

Categorization 
On March 22, 2010, El Castillo was officially recognized as a five-star hotel by the Córdoba Tourism Agency. It is the first 5 star hotel in the Sierras of Córdoba and the only in the province outside of the capital.

Case Study and Academic Participation 
El Castillo is the first South American hotel that has been analysed by the international academic community. The case study, written by Emeritus Professor Jonathan Story and certified by the  INSEAD and RPI Universities, describes how it was possible to create a product that was previously non-existent, that combines family tourism and business training, all while obtaining record numbers of growth and client satisfaction. The analysis shows special emphasis on the high risk that the entrepreneurial family had to overcome, with obstacles such as the profound economic crisis (the December 2001 Crisis in Argentina), lack of credit, remote vendors, expensive technology, changing context, devalued location, and laws contrary to ecotourism. El Castillo has been invited by various universities to present their vision and commitment as a responsible social actor. In 2010, its founders were invited to join the “Fordham Consortium on the Purpose of Business”, an initiative of Fordham University, the Jesuit University of New York. In 2013 El Castillo was awarded by the British Argentine Chamber of Commerce with the "First Prize for Sustainable Leadership".

References 

Hotels in Argentina
Palaces in Argentina
National Historic Monuments of Argentina
Houses completed in 1870
Buildings and structures in Córdoba, Argentina